Music for the People may refer to:

Music for the People (The Enemy album), the second studio album by Coventry-based band The Enemy
Music for the People (Marky Mark and the Funky Bunch album), the debut album of American hip hop group Marky Mark and the Funky Bunch